eZ Platform (pronounced "easy platform") is an open-source enterprise PHP content management system (CMS) and Digital eXperience Platform (DXP) developed by the company Ibexa (known previously as eZ Systems), which has headquarters Oslo, Norway and offices in Germany, France, Poland, England, US and Japan. eZ Platform is freely available under the GNU GPL version 2 license, as well as under proprietary licenses that include commercial support as well as access to additional features. The commercial version of the software extends the capabilities of the open-source core with features such as personalization, e-Commerce and additional editorial and development capabilities.

The initial version of eZ Platform was released on December 15, 2015.

The latest stable and long-term supported version was released on March 29, 2019.

On April 2, 2020, Ibexa released eZ Platform Version 3, the next generation of its Digital eXperience Platform (DXP).

Origins of eZ Platform

eZ Platform is the successor to eZ Publish, an Open Source CMS in development since 1999. The previous iteration, eZ Publish 5, was a hybrid approach with old code as well as rewritten code. eZ Platform drops all the legacy code from the software and completed the transition to a complete new code base built on the Symfony Full Stack Framework. The content repository core and user interface are rewritten, but retains the same concepts as the previous eZ Publish software as well as adding more functionality.

Features and relation to the Symfony Framework

eZ Platform is built on the Symfony Full Stack Framework. Since eZ Platform is based on the complete framework, developers can integrate any Symfony extension (i.e. bundle) into eZ Platform to add more functionality and, vice versa, Symfony developers can integrate eZ Platform into their Symfony projects. eZ Platform itself is—in Symfony terms—a number of bundles standing on top of Symfony which add features such as:

 A content repository with multilingual capabilities and versioning
 A User Interface for managing the content repository
 REST and GraphQL APIs for interacting with the content repository using JavaScript or other clients
 A Siteaccess configuration model for matching URLs to provide views to the repository
 User and permission management to control access into the repository
 Integrated Solr search engine for performance and search features

Relation to eZ Platform Enterprise Edition  

eZ Platform core is free software, but it also serves as the engine of eZ Platform Enterprise Edition, Ibexa's commercially supported Digital eXperience Platform (DXP). eZ Platform Enterprise Edition consists of eZ Platform Open Source core and a set of additional features by Ibexa. Features for content creation and collaboration and landing page management including automated content scheduling, drag-and-drop blocks and in-page editing using the APIs provided by eZ Platform. This set of features was previously named eZ Studio, but Ibexa has abandoned that name

References

External links

 

 

Free content management systems